Guillebeau House is a historic home located in Hickory Knob State Resort Park near Willington in McCormick County, South Carolina.  It was built in about 1764 and is a double-pen log house with one exterior chimney and two front entrances. It has a full-width, shed-roof porch.

Built by Andre Guillebeau (1739-1814) shortly after his arrival at the French Huguenot settlement known as New Bordeaux, the house was moved to Hickory Knob State Resort Park in about 1983.  Included in the original NRHP listing was the contributing family cemetery.

It was listed on the National Register of Historic Places in 1973.

References 

Houses on the National Register of Historic Places in South Carolina
Houses completed in 1764
Houses in McCormick County, South Carolina
National Register of Historic Places in McCormick County, South Carolina
1764 establishments in South Carolina